Coquillettia is a genus of plant bugs in the family Miridae. There are more than 30 described species in Coquillettia.

Species
These 39 species belong to the genus Coquillettia:

 Coquillettia ajo Knight, 1968
 Coquillettia albella Knight, 1968
 Coquillettia albertae Kelton, 1980
 Coquillettia albiclava Knight, 1925
 Coquillettia alpina Polhemus & Polhemus, 1988
 Coquillettia amoena (Uhler, 1877)
 Coquillettia amoenus (Uhler, 1877)
 Coquillettia aquila Bliven, 1962
 Coquillettia attica Bliven, 1962
 Coquillettia balli Knight, 1918
 Coquillettia concava Wyniger, 2012
 Coquillettia foxi Van Duzee, 1921
 Coquillettia gigantea Wyniger, 2012
 Coquillettia granulata Knight, 1930
 Coquillettia impluviata Wyniger, 2012
 Coquillettia insignis Uhler, 1890
 Coquillettia jessiana Knight, 1927
 Coquillettia lactea Wyniger, 2012
 Coquillettia laticeps Knight, 1927
 Coquillettia luteiclava Knight, 1968
 Coquillettia mimetica Osborn, 1898
 Coquillettia nicholi Knight, 1925
 Coquillettia nigrithorax Knight, 1930
 Coquillettia numata Bliven, 1962
 Coquillettia obscura Wyniger, 2012
 Coquillettia pergrandis Wyniger, 2012
 Coquillettia perplexabilis Wyniger, 2012
 Coquillettia polhemorum Wyniger, 2012
 Coquillettia pseudoattica Wyniger, 2012
 Coquillettia saxetana Bliven, 1962
 Coquillettia schuhi Wyniger, 2012
 Coquillettia schwartzi Wyniger, 2012
 Coquillettia soligena Bliven, 1962
 Coquillettia terrosa Bliven, 1962
 Coquillettia thomasi Wyniger, 2012
 Coquillettia uhleri Van Duzee, 1921
 Coquillettia venusta Wyniger, 2012
 Coquillettia vicina Wyniger, 2012
 Coquillettia virescens Knight, 1968

References

Further reading

 
 
 

Phylinae
Articles created by Qbugbot